South Whitehall Township is a township in Lehigh County, Pennsylvania. The township's population was 19,180 at the 2010 census.  It is a suburb of Allentown and is part of the Lehigh Valley, which had a population of 861,899 and was the 68th most populous metropolitan area in the U.S. as of the 2020 census.

The Lehigh Valley interchange of the Northeast Extension of the Pennsylvania Turnpike and Dorney Park & Wildwater Kingdom are both located in the township.

History

18th century
The first settlers of the Lehigh Valley region were Germans who emigrated from earlier settlements along Perkiomen Creek. The earliest settlers arrived in the region over a 20-year period beginning in about 1732. The immigration of the Germans and other European natives, including Swiss and Huguenots, was aided by William Penn and his friends. The land lying south of South Mountain was given to William Penn in 1713 by the Lenni Lenape people. The land of Lehigh County lying between Blue Mountain and Lehigh Mountain was given to Penn's sons by the Lenapes in 1732. Emigrants sought the fertile, limestone valley flanking rivers and streams, such as Jordan Creek.

One of the earliest tracts of land purchased in the township was by Nicholas Kern, who bought property on December 3, 1735, and October 28, 1737. Some of this was sold to Lorenz Guth on February 27, 1739. Guth continued to buy land in the area of the Reformed Church property and also in the Guthsville area. By 1769 his holdings totaled . The Lorenz Guth house near Wehr's Dam still stands in excellent condition and is a fine example of colonial architecture.

Much of the history of South Whitehall can be traced to the Walbert-Guthsville region, and especially the two Jordan churches. The first ministration to the Lutherans in the township occurred in 1734 when Reverend John Casper Stoever baptized Margaret, the daughter of the John Lichtenwalners, on February 6. In 1736 a Reverend Schmidt preached occasionally to the Lutherans, and in 1739 Reverend John Justus Jacob Birkenstock became pastor of the Jordan Lutheran congregation. In 1845 it was noted that the centennial of the congregation was observed, which would indicate that the first building was erected in 1745. The first church building was of logs and stood near the north wall of the old burial ground. It was used jointly by the Lutheran and Reformed congregations until about 1752 when the Reformed erected a building half a mile to the east, within sight of the current municipal building. The Lutherans built the present church in 1842–1843 at a cost of $3,581.24.

Members of the Reformed (United Church of Christ) religion settled in the area as early as 1738, and baptisms of their children during the period of 1740 to 1752 are recorded in the Lutheran record book. In 1752 Lorenz Guth presented the Reformed with a  tract of land, and a log church was erected in six weeks. The second and present church building, with its  steeple, was built in 1808. It stands as one of the oldest church buildings in the country, and is a fine example of the architecture of that period.

The early schools of the township were connected with the two Jordan churches for many years, possibly extending back to 1739. According to the Roberts history, the congregations were at first supplied not by pastors, but by teachers who used to read sermons on Sundays. Thus, it is possible that church-sponsored schools taught by the readers existed in the earliest days of the congregations.

The original name "Whitehall" dates to 1740 and encompasses the land now found in North Whitehall, South Whitehall, and Whitehall townships. Prior to the establishment of Northampton County in 1752, the area was part of Bucks County, and the land currently occupied by South Whitehall was known as "the back part of Macungie" on the Heidelberg District. The name Whitehall is thought to be derived from one of two sources: either a place in England, or for a white house erected as a hunting lodge near Jordan and Cedar creeks.

19th century
South Whitehall Township was established in 1810 by a petition to the Northampton County Court to divide former Whitehall Township into two areas, North Whitehall and South Whitehall. In 1812, Lehigh County was divided off from the original Northampton County, establishing South Whitehall Township within and nearly at the center of Lehigh County. Agriculture was the backbone of the economy of the township for many years. Much of the land today still is under cultivation. For more than a century at least six grain mills flourished on Jordan and Cedar creeks. In the early 19th century, iron ore was discovered at different places in the township, and mining operations were carried on from 1820 to 1890. In 1867, the eastern portion of South Whitehall and the southeastern portion of North Whitehall were detached and formed into Whitehall Township.

20th and 21st centuries
In 1966, South Whitehall became a First Class Township. The Dorneyville Crossroad Settlement, Haines Mill, Manasses Guth Covered Bridge, and Wehr Covered Bridge, each located in the township, have been listed with the National Register of Historic Places.

Geography 

It is drained by Jordan Creek and Little Lehigh Creek into the Lehigh River.

South Whitehall has a hot-summer humid continental climate (Dfa) and is in hardiness zone 6b.

South Whitehall's villages include Cetronia, Crackersport, Dorneyville (also in Salisbury Township), Greenawalds, Guthsville, Mechanicsville (also in North Whitehall), Meyersville (also in North Whitehall), Orefield (also in North Whitehall), Parkway Manor, Scherersville (also in Whitehall Township), Sterlingworth, Walbert, Wennersville, Westwood Heights, and Woodlawn.

Adjacent municipalities 
 Upper Macungie Township (southwest)
 Lower Macungie Township (south)
 Salisbury Township (south)
 Allentown (southeast)
 Whitehall Township (northeast)
 North Whitehall Township (north)
 Lowhill Township (tangent to the west)

Demographics 

As of the 2010 U.S. census, there were 19,180 people, 7,814 households, and 5,339 families residing in the township. The racial makeup of the township was 89.8% White, 2.8% African American, 0.1% Native American, 4.7% Asian, 1.3% from other races, and 1.3% from two or more races. Hispanic or Latino of any race were 4.7% of the population.

There were 7,814 households, out of which 29.5% had children under the age of 18 living with them, 56.6% were married couples living together, 8.5% had a female householder with no husband present, and 31.7% were non-families. 24.827% of all households were made up of individuals, and 35.1% had someone living alone who was 65 years of age or older. The average household size was 2.38 and the average family size was 2.89.

In the township, the population was spread out, with 21.6% under the age of 20, 3.9% from 20 to 24, 20.8% from 25 to 44, 31.7% from 45 to 64, and 22% who were 65 years of age or older. The median age was 46 years. For every 100 females, there were 89.6 males. For every 100 females age 18 and over, there were 86.9 males. The median income for a household in the township was $64,854, and the median income for a family was $78,629. Males had a median income of $55,047 versus $41,610 for females. The per capita income for the township was $36,274. About 2.6% of families and 3.8% of the population were below the poverty line, including 5.73% of those under age 18 and 4.2% of those age 65 or over.

Recreation 

South Whitehall Township is best known as the home of Dorney Park and Wildwater Kingdom, a popular amusement park. It also hosts the Lehigh County Soccer Fields, which are accessible from Broadway east of Route 309.

Government and politics
South Whitehall is represented by State Senator Pat Browne in the 16th district and US Representative Susan Wild in the 7th district. State Representative 
Zach Mako serves the 1st, 2nd, 6th, 7th, and 8th wards in the 183rd district and State Representative Ryan Mackenzie serves the 3rd, 4th, and 5th wards in the 134th district. All of its legislators are Republican, with the exception of US Representative Wild who is a Democrat.

Board of Commissioners
South Whitehall elects five at-large commissioners for four-year terms.

 Diane Kelly, President
 David M. Kennedy, Vice President
 Monica Hodges, Asst. Secretary
 Jacob D. Roth
 Brad Osborne

Public education
The township is served by the Parkland School District. Students in grades 9 through 12 attend Parkland High School, located on Cedar Crest Boulevard in the township. Both of middle schools (Orefield and Springhouse) are in South Whitehall, as are Cetronia, Kratzer, and Parkway Manor Elementary Schools. Some of the township's students attend Kernsville Elementary just over the North Whitehall line, while others attend Ironton Elementary located in North Whitehall Township. Kratzer is located in Greenawalds.

Transportation

The Lehigh Valley interchange of Interstate 476/Pennsylvania Turnpike Northeast Extension and U.S. Route 22 is in the western part of the township. Interstate 78 crosses the southern portion of the township concurrent with Pennsylvania Route 309. Additional thoroughfares include Cedar Crest Boulevard and Mauch Chunk Road north-to-south, and Walbert Avenue, Tilghman Street, Broadway, and Pennsylvania Route 222 (Hamilton Boulevard) east-to-west. LANTA serves multiple bus routes in South Whitehall connecting Allentown with its western and northern suburbs.

References

External links 

1732 establishments in Pennsylvania
Populated places established in 1732
Townships in Lehigh County, Pennsylvania
Townships in Pennsylvania